Tom Davis (born 27 April 1979) is an English actor and comedian best known for his role as DI Sleet in the BBC Three comedy Murder in Successville, and as Gary King (Jr) in the BBC sitcom King Gary.

Career 
Before television, Davis worked as a scaffolder, bouncer, market stall trader and a stand-up comedian. When his friend was working as a runner on Bo' Selecta, they gave some videos of their own comedy sketches to Leigh Francis, who then invited Davis to appear on the show. He appeared in various comedy roles on TV over the following years. 

In 2015 he co-created and starred in Murder in Successville. This semi-improvised show, in which a celebrity guest must help DI Sleet solve a fictional crime, became a cult hit. In 2016, Davis was named a BAFTA Breakthrough Brit and appeared in the films Free Fire and Prevenge.

Filmography

Film

Television

Podcast

Writing credits

Personal life 
Tom is married to Kathryn, and they have a daughter who was born in December 2021.

References

External links

21st-century English male actors
English male television actors
Place of birth missing (living people)
Living people
1979 births